The Porter-Gaud School is an independent coeducational college preparatory day school in Charleston, in the U.S. state of South Carolina. Porter-Gaud has an enrollment of about 1000 students, comprising an elementary school, middle school, and high school, and is located on the banks of the Ashley River. The school has historic ties to the Episcopal Church.

Porter-Gaud was formed in July 1964 from the merger of three schools: The Porter Military Academy (founded 1867), the Gaud School for Boys (founded 1908), and the Watt School (founded 1931). The legal name of the institution remains The Porter Academy.

Sexual misconduct scandal 

In October 2000, following Fischer's incarceration, a separate court determined that former Principal James Bishop Alexander and Headmaster Berkeley Grimball knew of the ongoing abuse by Fischer. The jury deemed both negligent in stopping the abuse. Neither Principal Alexander nor Headmaster Grimball were ultimately convicted, as each died prior to the court concluding. However, the court awarded the plaintiffs $105 million.

The scandal was the subject of a 2018 documentary, What Haunts Us. The film suggests the suicides of six graduates of the 1979 class were due to the mental impact of being sexually abused by Fischer. The colluding culture of the school with board members ignoring persistent pleas to be heard by one victim, who wrote to all the board members who never responded or discussed it, revealed that these young victims were trapped within a culture where the surface of respectability had to be maintained at all costs. Porter-Gaud school did make a public apology but not to the victims themselves.

Notable alumni 

 John Buse – President of the American Diabetes Association
 Octavus Roy Cohen – writer
 Stephen Colbert – comedian, host of The Late Show
 Joel Derfner – author, musical theater composer
 Shepard Fairey – artist
 Jack Hitt – writer and contributing editor for This American Life, Harper's and The New York Times Magazine; previously wrote for Rolling Stone and Wired
 Benjamin Hutto - Director of Choral Activities and Director of Performing Arts at St. Albans School for Boys and the National Cathedral School for Girls in Washington D.C., organist for St. John's Episcopal Church - "the Nation's Church"
 Josiah-Jordan James - basketball player for the Tennessee Volunteers
 George P. Kent - diplomat, Deputy Assistant Secretary of State for European and Eurasian Affairs
 Sallie Krawcheck – former CFO of Citigroup Inc.; former CEO of Smith Barney; member of the board of directors at Dell Computers, Head of Bank of America's Global Wealth Management division
 George Swinton Legaré – member of the United States House of Representatives, prominent Charleston lawyer
 Burnet R. Maybank – Depression-era mayor of Charleston, Governor of South Carolina and United States Senator
 Khris Middleton – NBA Championship winner for the Milwaukee Bucks, formerly of the Detroit Pistons; Olympic Gold Medalist
 Ovie Mughelli – NFL football player
 Aaron Nesmith - NBA basketball player for the Boston Celtics
 Vic Rawl – Democratic candidate for U.S. Senate; received national attention after losing to Alvin Greene
 Archibald Rutledge – South Carolina poet laureate
 Sonny Seiler – attorney, owner of Uga, the University of Georgia bulldog mascot 
 Charles P. Summerall – United States Army general, Army Chief of Staff
 Kurt W. Tidd – United States Navy Admiral Commander U.S. Southern Command

Notable faculty 

 Hervey Allen – author from Pennsylvania; works include: Anthony Adverse, Israfel, Action at Aquila, and The Forest and the Fort
 DuBose Heyward – author best known for his 1924 novel Porgy; co-author of the non-musical play adapted from the novel, which became the foundation of George Gershwin's opera Porgy and Bess
 Benjamin Hutto – music director and choirmaster at the school during the 70s through the 90s, during which time the Porter-Gaud Choir recorded several albums
 Wyndham Meredith Manning – member of the South Carolina House of Representatives

See also
 Charleston Arsenal, the original site of Porter Military Academy

References 

Private high schools in South Carolina
Private middle schools in South Carolina
Private elementary schools in South Carolina
Education in Charleston, South Carolina
Educational institutions established in 1867
Episcopal Church in South Carolina
Episcopal schools in the United States
Schools in Charleston County, South Carolina
Preparatory schools in South Carolina
1867 establishments in South Carolina